Nadine Cohen is currently Deputy CEO at Netball Australia, following roles as interim Chief Operating Officer, acting Head of Commercial and Head of Government Strategy & Social Innovation. Cohen has worked in Australian sport since early 2000, holding senior roles at the Australian Sports Commission, including Branch Head and acting Division Head of Funding, Sports Planning, Coaching and Officiating, National Athlete Career and Education, Ethics and Sports Partnerships. Cohen is a graduate of the Australian Institute of Company Directors, the Deakin University Sport Management Program and Swinburne University. She was awarded the 2007 Advancing Sport Management Award from Deakin University. In 2010, Cohen was awarded an Australia Day Achievement medallion in recognition of the strategic and structural changes she implemented at the Australian Sports Commission.

Cohen inaugurated Netball Australia charity, The Confident Girls Foundation that aims to provide opportunities for vulnerable girls to thrive through netball. The Foundation helps girls achieve their dreams by highlighting and helping eliminate key drivers of gender bias including, financial barriers, lack of leadership opportunities, isolation, gender stereotypes that negatively affect young women, and barriers to physical activity.

Cohen led the development of The Essence of Australian Sport a national declaration of guiding ethical principles (respect, safety, responsibility and fairness) and implementation strategies for the sport industry. Cohen was instrumental in negotiating the partnership between the Australian Sports Commission and the Victorian Equal Opportunity and Human Rights Commission to provide fair, safe and inclusive environments at grass roots clubs.

Cohen represented the Australian government at World Anti-Doping Agency Conferences, Council of Europe Monitoring Group Anti-Doping Convention meetings, World Anti-Doping Agency's International Federation Symposium, International Anti-Doping Arrangement meetings and Association of National Anti-Doping Organisations meetings. Cohen was critical in ensuring all Australian national sporting organisations adopted the World Anti-Doping Code.

Cohen case managed more than 40 anti-doping policy breaches on behalf of the Australian Sports Commission, including Shane Warne, Ben Tune, Nathan Baggaley, investigations into Australian weightlifters and allegations made against Australian Institute of Sport cyclists.

Cohen is a member of the Deakin University Sport Management Advisory Board, Coalition of Major Professional and Participation Sports Streering Committee and Integrity Committee, and Commonwealth Bank Multi-Cultural Community Banking External Cultural Diversity Advisory Council.

References

External links
Netball Australia
Australian Sports Commission

Living people
Australian sports executives and administrators
Year of birth missing (living people)
Place of birth missing (living people)
Australian netball administrators